Clark County is located in the U.S. state of Nevada.  As of the 2020 census, the population was 2,265,461. Most of the county population resides in the Las Vegas Census County Divisions, which hold 2,196,623 people as of the 2020 Census, across . It is by far the most populous county in Nevada, and the 12th most populous county in the United States. It covers 7% of the state's land area but holds 73% of the state's population, making Nevada one of the most centralized states in the United States.

History

Las Vegas, the state's most populous city, has been the county seat since its establishment. The county was formed by the Nevada Legislature by splitting off a portion of Lincoln County on February 5, 1909, and was organized on July 1, 1909. The Las Vegas Valley, a  basin, includes Las Vegas and other major cities and communities such as North Las Vegas, Henderson, and the unincorporated community of Paradise.

Native Americans lived in the Las Vegas Valley beginning over 10,000 years ago. Paiutes moved into the area as early as AD 700. Previously part of the Mexican Territory of Alta California, the Clark County lands were subsequently traversed by American beaver trappers. Word of their journeys inspired the New Mexican merchant Antonio Armijo in 1829 to establish the first route for mule trains and herds of livestock from Nuevo Mexico to Alta California through the area, along the Virgin and Colorado Rivers. Called the Armijo Route of the Old Spanish Trail, the route was later modified into the Main Route by the passing merchants, trappers, drovers, Ute raiders and settlers over the years by moving to a more direct route. In Clark County it was northward away from the Colorado to a series of creeks, waterholes and springs like those at Las Vegas, to which John C. Frémont added Frémont's Cutoff on his return from California to Utah in 1844.

What is now Clark County was acquired by the United States during the Mexican–American War, becoming part of the northwestern corner of New Mexico Territory. In 1847, Jefferson Hunt and other Mormon Battalion members returning to Salt Lake City from Los Angeles pioneered a wagon route through the County that became the Mormon Road. In 1849, this road became known as the "Southern Route", the winter route of the California Trail from Salt Lake City to Los Angeles during the California Gold Rush. By the mid-1850s, the route now known as the Salt Lake Road in California, and the California Road in Utah Territory, was a wagon trade route between the two. In the mid-1850s, Mormons established a settlement at Las Vegas. In the 1860s, Mormon colonies were established along the Virgin and Muddy Rivers.

All of the county was part of Mohave County, Arizona Territory, when that Territory was formed in 1863, before Nevada became a state. In 1865, it became part of Pah-Ute County, Arizona Territory. The part of Pah-Ute County north and west of the Colorado River was assigned to the new State of Nevada in 1866; however, Arizona territory fought the division until 1871. Pah-Ute County became part of Lincoln County and the westernmost part became the southernmost part of Nye County.

Clark County was named for William A. Clark, a Montana copper magnate and Democratic U.S. Senator. Clark was largely responsible for construction of the San Pedro, Los Angeles and Salt Lake Railroad through the area, contributing to the region's early development. Clark County is a major tourist destination, with 150,000 hotel rooms. The Las Vegas Strip, home to most of the hotel-casinos known to many around the world, is not within the City of Las Vegas limits, but in unincorporated Paradise. It is, however, in the Las Vegas Valley.

Clark County is geographically coextensive with the Las Vegas MSA, a metropolitan statistical area designated by the Office of Management and Budget and used by the United States Census Bureau and other agencies for statistical purposes. Over time and influenced by climate change, droughts in Southern Nevada have been increasing in frequency and severity, putting a further strain on Clark County’s and Las Vegas's water security.

Geography

The Colorado River forms the county's southeastern boundary, with Hoover Dam forming Lake Mead along much of its length. The lowest point in the state of Nevada is on the Colorado River just south of Laughlin in Clark County, where it flows out of Nevada into California  and Arizona. Other than the forests on Mount Charleston, the geography in Clark County is a desert. Creosote bushes are the main native vegetation, and the mountains are mostly rocky with little vegetation. The terrain slopes to the south and east.

Adjacent counties

 Lincoln County – north
 Mohave County, Arizona – east (observes Mountain Time)
 San Bernardino County, California – south
 Inyo County, California – southwest
 Nye County – west

National protected areas

 Desert National Wildlife Refuge (part)
 Humboldt-Toiyabe National Forest (part)
 Lake Mead National Recreation Area (part)
 Moapa Valley National Wildlife Refuge
 Red Rock Canyon National Conservation Area
 Sloan Canyon National Conservation Area
 Spring Mountains National Recreation Area (part)
 Toiyabe National Forest (part)
 Tule Springs Fossil Beds National Monument (part)

Twenty official wilderness areas in Clark County are part of the National Wilderness Preservation System. Many of these are in, or partially in, one of the preceding protected areas, as shown below. Many are separate entities that are managed by the Bureau of Land Management (BLM):

 Arrow Canyon Wilderness (BLM)
 Black Canyon Wilderness (Nevada) (Lake Mead National Recreational Area [NRA])
 Bridge Canyon Wilderness (Lake Mead NRA)
 Eldorado Wilderness (Lake Mead NRA / BLM)
 Ireteba Peaks Wilderness (Lake Mead NRA / BLM)
 Jimbilnan Wilderness (Lake Mead NRA)
 Jumbo Springs Wilderness (BLM)
 La Madre Mountain Wilderness (BLM / Toiyabe National Forest [NF])
 Lime Canyon Wilderness (BLM)
 Meadow Valley Range Wilderness (BLM) mostly in Lincoln County, Nevada
 Mormon Mountains Wilderness (BLM) mostly in Lincoln County, Nevada
 Mount Charleston Wilderness (Toiyabe NF / BLM)
 Muddy Mountains Wilderness (BLM / Lake Mead NRA)
 Nellis Wash Wilderness (Lake Mead NRA)
 North McCullough Wilderness (part of Sloan Canyon NCA, which is managed by BLM)
 Pinto Valley Wilderness (Lake Mead NRA)
 Rainbow Mountain Wilderness (BLM / Toiyabe NF)
 South McCullough Wilderness (BLM)
 Spirit Mountain Wilderness (Lake Mead NRA / BLM)
 Wee Thump Joshua Tree Wilderness (BLM)

Environmental factors

Clark County has diverse desert flora and fauna, including higher-elevation mountain areas, the desert floor, and the Colorado River/Lake Mead ecosystems. Variations in diurnal temperature as well as seasonal swings in temperature create demanding adaptation elements on the species of this county. Population expansion, especially since 1970, has placed additional pressure on species in the area.

Correspondingly, air quality levels prior to the 1960s were in a favorable range, but the proliferation of automobiles with the human population expansion created circumstances where some federal air quality standards were violated starting in the 1980s.

To plan for the wave of development forecast by 1980, Clark County embarked on a regional environmental impact assessment funded by a federal Section 208 program, with Sedway Cooke conducting the planning work and Earth Metrics performing environmental analysis. This endeavor projected population growth, land use changes and environmental impacts.

To prevent the loss of federal funds due to unacceptable dust levels in the Las Vegas valley, in 2003 the Nevada Air Quality Management division (under direction of Clark County officials) created the  "Don't Be a Dusthole" campaign. The campaign successfully raised awareness of dust pollution in the Las Vegas valley, quantifiably reducing pollutants and preserving ongoing federal funding.

Republic Services owns and operates the landfill.

Earthquake hazards
Nevada is the third most seismically active state in the U.S. (after Alaska and California); the United States Geological Survey has estimated that over the next 50 years, Clark County has a 10–20% chance of a M6.0 or greater earthquake occurring within  of Las Vegas.

Demographics

Note: the US Census treats Hispanic/Latino as an ethnic category. This table excludes Latinos from the racial categories and assigns them to a separate category. Hispanics/Latinos can be of any race.

2000 census
In 2000 there were 512,253 households, out of which 31.7% had children under the age of 18 living with them, 48.7% were married couples living together, 11.8% had a female householder with no husband present, and 33.7% were non-families. 24.5% of all households were made up of individuals, and 6.7% had someone living alone who was above age 64. The average household size was 2.65 and the average family size was 3.17.

The county population contained 25.6% under the age of 18, 9.2% from 18 to 24, 32.2% from 25 to 44, 22.3% from 45 to 64, and 10.7% who were over age 64. The median age was 34 years. For every 100 females there were 103.50 males. For every 100 females age 18 and over, there were 102.80 males.

The median income for a household in the county was $53,536, and the median income for a family was $59,485. Males had a median income of $35,243 versus $27,077 for females. The per capita income for the county was $21,785. About 7.9% of families and 10.8% of the population were below the poverty line, including 14.1% of those under age 18 and 7.3% of those over age 64.

Large numbers of new residents in the state originate from California.

2010 census
As of the 2010 United States Census, there were 1,951,269 people, 715,365 households, and 467,916 families in the county. The racial makeup of the county was 60.9% White, 13.5% Black or African American, 8.7% Asian, 0.7% Pacific islander, 0.7% American Indian, 10.5% from other races, and 5.1% from two or more races. Those of Hispanic or Latino origin made up 29.1% of the population. In terms of ancestry, 11.7% were German, 9.1% were Irish, 7.6% were English, 6.3% were Italian, and 2.7% were American.

Of the 715,365 households, 34.9% had children under the age of 18 living with them, 45.0% were married couples living together, 13.5% had a female householder with no husband present, 34.6% were non-families, and 25.3% of all households were made up of individuals. The average household size was 2.70 and the average family size was 3.26. The median age was 35.5 years.

The median income for a household in the county was $56,258 and the median income for a family was $63,888. Males had a median income of $43,693 versus $35,324 for females. The per capita income for the county was $27,422. About 8.7% of families and 11.7% of the population were below the poverty line, including 16.9% of those under age 18 and 7.6% of those age 65 or over.

Economy

The county is home to many gaming-related companies. Station Casinos is headquartered in unincorporated Clark County, along with Golden Entertainment, American Casino & Entertainment Properties, Bally Technologies, Cannery Casino Resorts, The Majestic Star Casino, LLC, Ameristar Casinos, Archon Corporation, Boyd Gaming, Las Vegas Sands, MGM Resorts International, Wynn Resorts, DBT Online Inc., Two Plus Two Publishing, Gambler's Book Shop / GBC Press, Millennium Management Group, Navegante Group, Pinnacle Entertainment and Tropicana Entertainment.

Largest employers

According to data collected by the Research and Analysis Bureau of the Nevada Department of Employment, Training and Rehabilitation, Clark County's largest employers, both public and private employers, as reported in the fourth quarter of 2012:

30,000 to 39,999 employees
 Clark County School District
5,000 to 10,000 employees

 Clark County government
 Nellis Air Force Base
 Wynn Las Vegas
 Bellagio
 MGM Grand Las Vegas
 Aria Resort & Casino
 Mandalay Bay Resort and Casino
 Caesars Palace
 Las Vegas Metropolitan Police Department
 University of Nevada, Las Vegas

2,500 to 4,999

 The Venetian Las Vegas
 The Mirage
 The Cosmopolitan of Las Vegas
 University Medical Center of Southern Nevada
 The Palazzo
 Encore Las Vegas
 Flamingo Las Vegas
 Southwest Airlines
 City of Las Vegas municipal Government
 Paris Las Vegas

Gaming areas
The State of Nevada divides the state into several gaming districts. Accordingly, the Clark County is divided into the following reporting districts:
 Boulder Strip: This region includes 33 casinos on Boulder Highway. Casinos within the Henderson city limits are included as well, such as Green Valley Ranch, Sunset Station, The Pass, and Jokers Wild.
 Downtown: There are 19 casinos in this reporting area.
 LV Strip: This region is composed of all the casinos on Las Vegas Boulevard, from The Stratosphere at the north end to Mandalay Bay on the south end. Also included are resorts near this area, such as The Rio, South Point, and the Hard Rock; and Harry Reid International Airport (formerly McCarran Airport). 
 North Las Vegas: This region has 11 casinos and includes the Cannery, Jerry's Nugget, and the Santa Fe Station.
 Laughlin: The casinos in Laughlin.
 Mesquite: The casinos in Mesquite.
 Balance of County: There are 66 casinos in this category that includes casinos at Lake Las Vegas, Jean, Primm, the Railroad Pass and Hacienda casinos, along with other casinos that don't fit any other category such as Arizona Charlie's Decatur, Gold Coast, The Orleans, The Palms, Suncoast, Rampart, and Red Rock Resort Spa and Casino

Parks and recreation

Government

The Clark County Commission consists of seven members who are elected to serve staggered four-year terms in biennial partisan elections. The commission members elect a chairman, who chairs their meetings. A hired county manager handles day-to-day operations under direction of the commission. The county's unincorporated towns also have appointed boards that provide advice to the commission.

The county operates out of the Clark County Government Center in the City of Las Vegas. The building is unusual in shape, and includes an outdoor amphitheater for concerts and other events.

The Las Vegas Metropolitan Police Department provides most law enforcement services in the county, including operation of the county's central jail, the Clark County Detention Center (CCDC). The present department was created in 1973 when the Clark County Sheriff's Department merged with the Las Vegas Police Department.

Other entities with police forces include University of Nevada, Las Vegas, the Clark County School District, and cities such as Henderson, Mesquite, Boulder City and North Las Vegas. The Clark County Park Police is responsible for all of the parks operated by the county and some selected special venues, such as the Clark County Amphitheater, Clark County Archery Range, and the Desert Rose Golf Course.

The Regional Justice Center replaced the Clark County Courthouse in 2005, and is about 3 blocks from downtown Fremont Street, at 200 Lewis Avenue.

Courts 
The Clark County Justice Courts are divided into eleven townships. Each elects its own justices of the peace for limited jurisdiction cases and a constable. They do not correspond with city boundaries. The Las Vegas Justice Court Township the city of Las Vegas and the unincorporated towns of Blue Diamond, Cactus Springs, Enterprise, Indian Springs, Mount Charleston, Paradise, Spring Valley, Summerlin South, Sunrise Manor (partially in North Las Vegas Township), Whitney (partially in Henderson Township) and Winchester.  The city of Las Vegas has a separate municipal court for traffic and criminal misdemeanor offenses that occur within the city's incorporated boundaries.

The Clark County Marshal's Office provides security for Clark County courts. The Marshal is head of the office, while Deputy Marshals act as bailiffs for the court.

Voter registration
According to the Secretary of State's office, Democrats comprise a plurality of registered voters in Clark County.

Politics

With nearly three-quarters of Nevada's population, Clark County plays a significant role in determining statewide Nevada elections as well the winner of the state's electoral votes in presidential elections. At the presidential level, the county, like most urban counties nationwide, leans Democratic. The last Republican to carry the county was George H. W. Bush in 1988. However, it is somewhat less Democratic than many other urban counties; the GOP candidate has received at least 39 percent of the vote in every election since 1996. This Democratic trend predates the county's explosive growth in the second half of the 20th century. Republican presidential candidates have only won the county six times from 1912 to the present day, all coming in national landslides where the Republican won over 400 electoral votes.

At the statewide level, however, the county is more of a swing county, with several Republican gubernatorial candidates and U.S. Senators winning the county since the late 1980s. The last Republican senator to win the county was John Ensign in his 2006 victory, even as Jim Gibbons lost it in his gubernatorial win over Dina Titus that year. Both Kenny Guinn and Brian Sandoval carried the county in both gubernatorial terms they won, however.

In 2018, Dean Heller carried 15 of Nevada's 17 county-level jurisdictions in his bid for a second full term in the U. S. Senate. Democratic challenger Jacky Rosen won Clark county. In that year's gubernatorial election, Democrat Steve Sisolak lost 15 out of 17 county-level jurisdictions, but won Clark.  Since 2008, the Democratic presidential candidate has won Clark by more than enough votes to carry Nevada.

The city of Las Vegas itself leans Democratic, as do the communities of Paradise, Spring Valley and Enterprise. The city of North Las Vegas and the communities of Sunrise Manor, Winchester and Whitney are more strongly Democratic, while the city of Henderson and the Summerlin South community have a Republican lean. Boulder City, where gambling is prohibited, leans Republican. Outside Las Vegas Valley, the county leans Republican.

Regional agencies
The Clark County Regional Flood Control District (CCRFCD) was created in 1985 by the Nevada Legislature allowing Clark County to provide broad solutions to flooding problems.

The Regional Transportation Commission of Southern Nevada operates the RTC Transit system, and does planning for most major roadways.

The Southern Nevada Water Authority is a multi-agency group that manages the water distribution for the Las Vegas Valley.

The Las Vegas Wash Coordination Committee manages and protects the Las Vegas Wash.

Since 1999 the group has added more the 15,000 plants to stabilize the wash's banks and restore and expand the wetlands surrounding the wash.

State government
The Grant Sawyer State Office Building, which houses many branches of state government, is within the City of Las Vegas.

The Nevada Department of Corrections operates three prisons within Clark County. High Desert State Prison, a medium-maximum prison, and the Southern Desert Correctional Center, a medium security prison, are both near Indian Springs, Nevada.

The Florence McClure Women's Correctional Center, originally called Southern Nevada Women's Correctional Facility, opened in North Las Vegas on September 1, 1997. It was built and operated by Corrections Corporation of America. On October 1, 2004, the Department of Corrections took direct control of the facility. It houses the female death row.

Education
The Clark County School District serves all of Clark County, with 228 elementary schools, 59 middle schools, and 54 high schools being the fifth largest in the country. Student enrollment in 2014 was 324,093.

Colleges serving the area are University of Nevada, Las Vegas (UNLV), College of Southern Nevada, and Nevada State College.

Transportation

Public transit 
Public transit service throughout Clark County is provided by RTC Transit, which is a subsidiary of the Regional Transportation Commission of Southern Nevada. RTC Transit operates The Deuce Bus rapid transit service between Downtown Las Vegas and the Las Vegas Strip.

Major highways

  Interstate 11
  Interstate 15
  Interstate 215
  Interstate 515
  U.S. Route 93
  U.S. Route 93 Business (Boulder City, Nevada)
  U.S. Route 95
  U.S. Route 95 Business (Las Vegas)
  State Route 146
  State Route 147
  State Route 156
  State Route 157
  State Route 158
  State Route 159
  State Route 160
  State Route 161
  State Route 163
  State Route 164
  State Route 165
  State Route 168
  State Route 169
  State Route 170
  State Route 171
  State Route 172
  State Route 173
  State Route 562
  State Route 564
  State Route 573
  State Route 574
  State Route 578
  State Route 579
  State Route 582
  State Route 592
  State Route 593
  State Route 595
  State Route 596
  State Route 599
  State Route 602
  State Route 604
  State Route 610
  State Route 612
  State Route 613
  County Route 215

Rail
 Las Vegas Monorail 
Clark County previously had Amtrak service on the Desert Wind, which served Las Vegas Station until it stopped service in 1997. Las Vegas and Laughlin are still served by Amtrak Thruway Motorcoach service which connects to the Southwest Chief.

Resort trams
 Aria Express
 Mandalay Bay Tram
 The Mirage-Treasure Island Tram

Communities

Bracketed number refers to location on map, right

Cities
 Boulder City (21)
 Henderson (19)
 Las Vegas (10) (county seat)
 Mesquite (4)
 North Las Vegas (9)

Census-designated places

 Blue Diamond (18)
 Bunkerville (5)
 Cal-Nev-Ari (23)
 Enterprise (17)
 Goodsprings (20)
 Indian Springs (6)
 Laughlin (24)
 Moapa Town (1)
 Moapa Valley (3)
 Mount Charleston (7)
 Nelson
 Paradise (15)
 Sandy Valley (16)
 Searchlight (22)
 Spring Valley (13)
 Summerlin South (12)
 Sunrise Manor (11)
 Whitney (formerly East Las Vegas) (26)
 Winchester (14)

Air Force bases
 Creech Air Force Base
 Nellis Air Force Base

Unincorporated communities

 Arden (former CDP)
 Cactus Springs
 Cottonwood Cove
 Coyote Springs (planned)
 Crystal (former CDP)
 Fort Mojave Indian Reservation (former CDP) (25)
 Glendale (former CDP)
 Jean
 Logandale
 Las Vegas Indian Colony (8)
 Moapa River Indian Reservation (2)
 Mountain Springs
 Overton
 Primm
 Roach
 Sloan
 Summerlin
 Sutor
 Vegas Creek (former CDP)

Climate

See also

 Clark County Fire Department (Nevada)
 List of airports in Clark County, Nevada
 National Register of Historic Places listings in Clark County, Nevada

References

External links

 
 Clark County Television (County of Clark owned television station with live Internet feed)

 
1909 establishments in Nevada
Populated places established in 1909